Saint Maximus of Aveia (d. ca. 250 AD) (sometimes also known as Saint Maximus of Aquila) is one of the patron saints of L'Aquila, Italy.

He was born in Aveia, nowadays known as Fossa. 
A deacon, he was martyred for his faith. The tradition says he was tortured and then thrown over a cliff near his native city. This occurred during the persecutions of Decius.

In 1256 the episcopal seat of Aveia was moved to L'Aquila, together with the relics of Maximus.
The newly built cathedral of the Roman Catholic Archdiocese of L'Aquila was dedicated in his name and that of Saint George, another martyr.

See also
Catholic Church in Italy
List of early Christian saints
Saint Maximus of Aveia, patron saint archive

References

External links
  Entry in the Saints and Blessed encyclopedia
Catholic Encyclopedia article on Aquila

Italian saints
3rd-century Christian saints